Patrick McEnroe and Jared Palmer were the defending champions, but did not participate this year.

Grant Connell and Patrick Galbraith won the title, defeating Luis Lobo and Javier Sánchez 6–4, 6–3 in the final.

Seeds

  Grant Connell /  Patrick Galbraith (champions)
  Henrik Holm /  Alex O'Brien (first round)
  Mark Kratzmann /  Brett Steven (first round)
  Gary Muller /  Piet Norval (semifinals)

Draw

Draw

External links
Draw

ATP Auckland Open
1995 ATP Tour